Zavet is a town in northeastern Bulgaria, part of Razgrad Province and located in the geographic region of Ludogorie. It is the administrative centre of the homonymous Zavet Municipality, which lies in the northern part of Razgrad Province. Zavet is situated in the western Ludogorie Plateau, 12 kilometres from Isperih and Kubrat and 35 kilometres from Tutrakan and Razgrad.

Zavet used to be a village in the 1970s, when Ostrovo was the municipal centre. In 1974, Zavet was promoted to the municipal centret, thus depriving Ostrovo of its status.

Municipality

Zavet municipality includes the following 7 places:

Honour
Zavet Saddle on Smith Island, South Shetland Islands is named after Zavet.

Gallery

External links
 Zavet municipality website 
 Zavet town website 
 Time capsule message dated Feb. 4, 1915, noting the cornerstone laying for a building to house the Samorazvitie Community Center & Public Library in Zavet, District of Razgrad, Bulgaria. (English)

Towns in Bulgaria
Populated places in Razgrad Province